The Pacific Northwest Booksellers Association Award, also known as the Pacific Northwest Book Award (PNBA), is an annual award presented by the Pacific Northwest Booksellers Association to recognize "excellence in writing" from the American Pacific Northwest. First awarded in 1964, the awards require that the author and/or illustrator reside within the five-state PNBA region (Washington, Oregon, Alaska, Montana, and Idaho) and that the book be published within the current calendar year. Past recipients include Chuck Palahniuk, Dana Simpson, Kim Barnes, Erik Larson, E.J. Koh, Karl Marlantes, Timothy Egan, Kathleen Flenniken, Donna Barba Higuera, Jonathan Raban and Lidia Yuknavitch.

References

External links
 

Awards established in 1965
American fiction awards
American non-fiction literary awards